Arthur "Artie"/"Arty" V. Royle (28 January 1862 – 17 March 1942) was an English rugby union footballer who played in the 1880s. He played at representative level for England, and at club level for Broughton Rangers, as a fullback, i.e. number 15. Prior to 2 June 1896, Broughton Rangers was a rugby union club.

Background
Arthur Royle was born in Salford, Lancashire, and he died aged 80 in Ilsington, Devon.

Playing career

International honours
Arthur Royle won a cap for England while at Broughton Rangers in 1889 against New Zealand Natives.

Change of Code
When Broughton Rangers converted from the rugby union code to the rugby league code on 2 June 1896, Arthur Royle would have been aged 34. Consequently, he may have been both a rugby union and rugby league footballer for Broughton Rangers.

References

External links
Search for "Royle" at rugbyleagueproject.org
Biography of Arthur Budd with an England team photograph including Arthur Royle
Search for "Arthur Royle" at britishnewspaperarchive.co.uk
Search for "Artie Royle" at britishnewspaperarchive.co.uk
Search for "Arty Royle" at britishnewspaperarchive.co.uk

1862 births
1942 deaths
Broughton Rangers players
England international rugby union players
English rugby union players
Rugby union players from Salford
Rugby union fullbacks